Mark Rosen is a former American volleyball head coach. He was most recently the head coach at the University of Michigan for 24 seasons from 1999 through 2022.

Early life and education
Rosen is a Native of Anchorage, AK. He went to college at California State University, Northridge, where he earned a bachelor's degree in Physical Education and a minor in Biology. He played volleyball at Cal State Northridge, he was a three-time varsity volleyball letterwinner.

Coaching career

Michigan
Mark Rosen began his career at Michigan in 1999, where he debuted with 16–15 record and NCAA Tournament appearance.

In 2008, Rosen broke Sandy Vong's team record for career wins at Michigan. The 2008 team compiled a 26-9 record, marking the first time the team had reached 20 wins in three consecutive seasons.

In 2009, Rosen's team compiled a 27–10 record, defeated No. 4-ranked Stanford in the second round of the NCAA Tournament, and ultimately advanced to the Elite Eight round of the NCAA Tournament.

In 2011, Michigan again defeated Stanford in the NCAA Tournament, reaching the Round of 16. In 2012, the team compiled a 27–12 record and advanced to the National Semifinal round of the NCAA Tournament for the first time in program history.

After the 2022 season, Michigan athletic director Warde Manuel announced that Rosen would not return for the 2023 season, after 24 seasons as the head coach.

Head coaching record

College

Personal life
Rosen's wife is Leisa (née Wissler) Rosen, Michigan Volleyball associate head coach. They have two sons, Brady and Cameron.

References

External links
 Mark Rosen at mgoblue.com

Living people
Cal State Northridge Matadors men's volleyball players
Sportspeople from Anchorage, Alaska
American volleyball coaches
Boise State Broncos women's volleyball coaches
Cal State Bakersfield Roadrunners women's volleyball coaches
Michigan Wolverines women's volleyball coaches
Northern Michigan Wildcats women's volleyball coaches
Year of birth missing (living people)